Snellgrove is a surname. Notable people with the surname include:

David Snellgrove (1920–2016), British Tibetologist 
David Snellgrove (born 1967), British cricketer
Ken Snellgrove (1941–2009), British cricketer